Federal Route 284, or Jalan Padang Donan,  is a federal road in Kedah, Malaysia. The Kilometre Zero is located at Bukit Kayu Hitam.

Features

At most sections, the Federal Route 284 was built under the JKR R5 road standard, allowing maximum speed limit of up to 90 km/h.

List of junctions

References

284